The Faiths of the Founding Fathers is a book by historian of American religion David L. Holmes of the College of William & Mary. Holmes approaches the topic of the religion of the founders of the United States by analyzing their public statements and correspondence, the comments left by their contemporaries, and the views, where available, of clergy who knew them.

See also
 Thomas Jefferson and religion

References

External links

2006 non-fiction books
American history books
History books about the American Revolution
History books about Christianity
History of religion in the United States
21st-century history books
Oxford University Press books